Denean Elizabeth Howard-Hill (born October 5, 1964) is an American athlete who competed mainly in the 400 metres.

At the Olympics she competed as Miss Howard in 1984, as Mrs. Howard-Hill in 1988, and as Mrs. Hill in 1992.

She competed for the United States, winning a gold medal at the 1984 Summer Olympics held in Los Angeles as a member of the 4 x 400 metres relay team, running in the preliminary rounds with her sister Sherri running in the final.  It was a reversal at the 1988 Summer Olympics held in Seoul, South Korea in the 4 x 400 metres relay, where both sisters won the silver medal, but Denean ran in the final with her teammates Diane Dixon, Valerie Brisco-Hooks and Florence Griffith Joyner.  The team set the current standing American Record in the event, which is still the second best time ever run behind the winning Soviet team in that race.

She is married to boxer, Virgil Hill;  her son Virgil was drafted by the St. Louis Cardinals in the sixth round of the 2009 MLB Draft, currently playing for the Class-A Batavia Muckdogs.

Denean Howard and her 3 sisters gained fame in 1979 when the four of them teamed up to set the National High School record in the 4x440 yard relay for San Gorgonio High School in San Bernardino.  That distance is now rarely run as the NFHS converted to metric distances, so the record still stands today.  Later teams with Denean broke the record for the slightly shorter 4x400 metres relay, after sister Atra graduated and the rest of the family moved to Kennedy High School (Los Angeles).  Denean was the California High School Athlete of the Year at Kennedy in 1982, following in the footsteps of her sister Sherri.  Also following her sister, she was named the national Girl's "High School Athlete of the Year" by Track and Field News, two years in a row.  Her 1982 52.39 was the NFHS national high school record for eighteen years, before it was beaten by Monique Henderson.  At age 15, she qualified for the ill-fated 1980 U.S. Olympic Team which was part of the 1980 Olympic Boycott finishing behind sister Sherri at the 1980 Olympic Trials, the first sisters to make the Olympic team simultaneously in the same event.

She is currently an assistant coach at the College of the Canyons.

References

External links
 
 California State Records before 2000
 
 
 

1964 births
Living people
American female sprinters
Athletes (track and field) at the 1984 Summer Olympics
Athletes (track and field) at the 1988 Summer Olympics
Athletes (track and field) at the 1992 Summer Olympics
Olympic silver medalists for the United States in track and field
World Athletics Championships medalists
Track and field athletes from California
Medalists at the 1992 Summer Olympics
Medalists at the 1988 Summer Olympics
Medalists at the 1984 Summer Olympics
Athletes (track and field) at the 1987 Pan American Games
Pan American Games gold medalists for the United States
Pan American Games bronze medalists for the United States
Olympic gold medalists for the United States in track and field
Pan American Games medalists in athletics (track and field)
Universiade medalists in athletics (track and field)
Universiade gold medalists for the United States
Medalists at the 1987 Summer Universiade
Medalists at the 1987 Pan American Games
Olympic female sprinters
21st-century American women